"Mientras Me Curo del Cora" (Spanish for "While I Heal My Heart") is a song by Colombian singer-songwriter Karol G. The song was released on March 7, 2023, through Universal Music Latino, as the sixth single from her fourth studio album, Mañana Será Bonito.

Background 
"Mientras Me Curo del Cora" was first teased at the Viña Del Mar International Song Festival on February 19, 2023, where a part of the song was performed live by Karol G for the first time. Giraldo also revealed that the song was featured on her then-upcoming fourth studio album. The song was officially released on February 24, 2023, alongside the release of its album, Mañana Será Bonito.

"Mientras Me Curo del Curo" samples "Don't Worry, Be Happy" by Robert McFerrin Jr..

Commercial performance 
"Mientras Me Curo del Cora" debuted at number 68 on the US Billboard Hot 100 chart dated March 11, 2023.

On the US Billboard Hot Latin Songs chart dated March 11, 2023 the song debuted at number 8, becoming Giraldo's nineteenth top ten on the chart.

On the Billboard Global 200 the song debuted at number 45 on the chart dated March 11, 2023.

Music video 
The music video for "Mientras Me Curo del Cora" was directed by Pedro Artola and was released on Karol G's YouTube channel on March 7, 2023.

Charts

References 

2023 singles
2023 songs
Karol G songs
Spanish-language songs
Songs written by Karol G